Manmadhan is 2004 Indian Tamil-language romantic thriller film directed by A. J. Murugan in his debut. Silambarasan played dual roles for the first time in his career while Jyothika did the main female lead with, Sindhu Tolani, Santhanam, Atul Kulkarni, and Goundamani play supporting roles. The music was composed by Yuvan Shankar Raja.

Manmadhan was received favourably and had a blockbuster run at the box office for over 150 days at the time of its release. It was remade in Kannada as Madana (2006).

Plot 
Madhan Kumar is an auditor by profession, who lives in Chennai and also learns music part-time in a college. Mythili, a naive woman, also learns music from the same college. She gets scared upon seeing Madhan Kumar one day because she happens to witness a dream of her getting raped by him. Later on, she realises his kind nature and they both become friends.

However, Madhan Kumar also has an arrogant and psychotic personality under the pseudonym Manmadhan, through which he hunts and kills morally corrupt girls in the city by seducing them before rendering them unconscious using chloroform. He burns the girls' corpses and stores their ashes in bottles with their respective names. Whenever he intends to kill a girl by seducing her, he suffers a nosebleed. The media attention turns towards the case of missing girls, and Chennai's new ACP Deva takes the charge to find the person behind the crimes.

One day, Mythili finds Madhan Kumar riding a bike with a girl as pillion. On the next day, Mythili gets shocked to see the news that the girl whom she spotted with Madhan Kumar has gone missing. Mythili thinks that Madhan Kumar is behind the crimes in the city and informs Deva about Madhan Kumar's whereabouts. Thus, Madhan Kumar gets arrested.

During the investigation, Madhan Kumar reveals that it was none other than his younger twin Madhan Raj responsible for killing erotic and corrupt girls under the pseudonym Manmadhan. The story then moves to a flashback where Madhan Raj and Madhan Kumar were affectionate with each other. They lived with their maternal uncle Puncture Pandiyan in Madhampatty in the outskirts of Coimbatore district, as both of their parents had died years ago. While Madhan Kumar was brave, intelligent and practical, Madhan Raj was innocent and sentimental. While Madhan Kumar went to study for auditorship in Chennai, Madhan Raj moved to Coimbatore to study in an engineering college. There, he became very close and friendly with his hostel roommate Bobby, and fell in love with his classmate Vaishnavi, who also reciprocated his feelings upon seeing his good nature. However, Madhan Raj's senior friend Ravi informed him that Vaishnavi was having an illicit affair with her relative Seenu, who also studied in the same college. He did not trust him and in anger he beat Ravi. When Madhan Raj confronted Vaishnavi, she got angry and thought that he did not trust her.

Madhan Raj realised his mistake and went to Vaishnavi's house to apologise, only to find her having sex with Seenu and enjoying the moment. He realised that Ravi was correct right from the beginning. Raj also heard Vaishnavi's conversation with Seenu that she pretended to love him and would like to marry him so that she could take advantage of his innocence and sincere love, which would help her lead life the way she wanted, and have Madhan Raj as a slave for her. Furious, Madhan Raj killed both Vaishnavi and Seenu. He returned to Chennai and arrogantly narrated the whole incident to Kumar. Madhan Raj decided to change his appearance and set out in search of girls cheating in the name of love to kill them and warned Madhan Kumar that if he informed the police of his whereabouts, he would kill him too.

Coming back to the present, the police investigate about Madhan Raj and get solid evidences against him. Madhan Kumar, with the help of Pandiyan, is released from the case. Mythili apologises to Madhan Kumar and also proposes to him, which he rejects, saying that he does not love her and had treated her as friend. Mythili leaves the place saying that she will wait for Madhan Kumar, believing that he will accept her love someday.

The story again moves to a flashback, where it is shown only to the audience that Madhan Kumar was indeed the real Manmadhan, and Madhan Raj was innocent of the crimes. After killing Seenu and Vaishnavi, Madhan Raj actually met Madhan Kumar but didn't fight him and felt that he regretted killing them and he did it only because he was triggered due to what they were doing and committed suicide in front of Madhan Kumar's eyes, despite the latter's pleas. Madhan Kumar hence decided to avenge Madhan Raj's death by killing girls who cheat in the name of love, under the pseudonym Manmadhan and developed his "nosebleed" from then on. Madhan Kumar has hidden his brother Madhan Raj's death, thereby using his identity as a scapegoat so that he could escape if caught.

It is shown that Madhan Kumar indeed loves Mythili for her innocence and good demeanour, but cannot and will not express his feelings for her. He also exclaims that if his brother had loved a girl like her, he would also have lived happily and he would have married Mythili and be happy. Hence, Madhan Kumar concludes that avenging his brother's death is more important, and only God can judge his actions. The film ends with a message that even if Manmadhan has escaped the clutches of the police, he would answer for his actions before the law someday.

Cast 
 Silambarasan as Madhan Kumar (Manmadhan) and Madhan Raj (Mottamadhan)
 Jyothika as Mythili (Voice dubbed by Savitha Reddy)
 Sindhu Tolani as Vaishnavi
 Goundamani as Puncture Pandiyan
 Atul Kulkarni as ACP Deva
 Santhanam as Bobby
 Sathyan as Inspector Shakthi (Deva's assistant)
 Mayuri as Malathi
 Guhan Shanmugam as Madhan Kumar's college rival
 T. P. Gajendran as Village Landlord
 Dr. S.Suresh Kumar as Reporter
 Crane Manohar as Puncture Pandiyan's worker
 Brinda Parekh as Train Passenger (guest appearance)
 Mandira Bedi as Psychiatrist (special appearance)
 Yana Gupta (Item number)
 Arzoo Govitrikar as girl in cafe whom Manmadhan kissed on her lips

Production 
Manmadhan is the directorial debut of A. J. Murugan. He said the script was initially pitched to Ajith Kumar in 1999, and Ajith, despite showing interest, asked Murugan to wait but never returned. In 2001, Murugan narrated the script to Silambarasan, who accepted. S. K. Krishnakanth, who agreed to produce the film, later told Murugan that Silambarasan wanted credit for the story and dialogues, and Silambarasan's mother Usha told Murugan he would only be allowed to continue as director if he credited her son for the story. Unwilling to jeopardise his career, Murugan complied. Silambarasan experienced difficulties with Murugan during the making of the film, and was widely reported by the media to have "ghost-directed" the project. Murugan was later demoted and worked in Silambarasan's directorial venture, Vallavan (2006) as an associate director, and was consequently critical of the actor's insistence on interfering with the director's role. According to cinematographer R. D. Rajasekhar, Manmadhan was the first Tamil film to be colour corrected through digital technology.

Soundtrack 
The soundtrack was composed by Yuvan Shankar Raja. The lyrics were penned by Vaali, Snehan, Pa. Vijay and Na. Muthukumar. "En Aasai Mythiliye", sung by Silambarasan, is remixed from his father T. Rajendar's original song in Mythili Ennai Kaathali (1986).

Telugu version 
The lyrics were written by Veturi, Vennalakanti and Buvana Chandra.

Release 
Manmadhan received an A (adults only) certificate from the censor board with some cuts. Though made on a high budget of 5 crore, it was sold at a deficit to distributors. However, the film opened with 140 prints and emerged successful despite facing competition from other Diwali releases such as Attahasam, Neranja Manasu and Chatrapathy.

Reception 
Sify wrote, "Manmathan is a taut thriller which engrosses the viewers with an engaging [narration], presentation, and is technically top class. [Silambarasan] has taken the audience by surprise with a good performance and contrary to his loud image that he had in films so far, he is a revelation". Malathi Rangarajan of The Hindu wrote that Silambarasan's "impressive story telling skills find the right platform" in Manmadhan. She added, "The hero takes on the onus of story, screenplay and direction supervision for the first time and displays a reasonable level of maturity." Malini Mannath of Chennai Online wrote, "‘Manmadhan’ is worth a watch, an engaging suspense thriller, a fare different from the routine romance-action flicks dished out to the audience." Visual Dasan of Kalki wrote that, though reminiscent of many American films including The Bone Collector, the plot was full of unpredictable twists and turns, and impresses without knives and without blood.

Box-office 
According to Sify, the film's collection reports from Chennai, Coimbatore and Salem distribution territories indicated that it surged ahead of Attahasam in its second week due to "rave reviews in the media and word-of-mouth among the youth".

References

External links 
 

2000s romantic thriller films
2000s Tamil-language films
2004 crime thriller films
2004 directorial debut films
2004 films
Films about brothers
Films scored by Yuvan Shankar Raja
Indian crime thriller films
Indian films about revenge
Indian romantic thriller films
Indian serial killer films
Tamil films remade in other languages
Twins in Indian films